The Pre-Romanesque art and architecture of the Iberian Peninsula (in Spanish, arte prerrománico; in Portuguese, arte pré-românica) refers to the art of Spain and Portugal after the Classical Age and before Romanesque art and architecture; hence the term Pre-Romanesque.

Visigothic art, the art of the Visigoths to 711, is usually classified as Migration Period art by art historians to emphasis its Germanic connections and origins; but can also classified as Pre-Romanesque, particularly in Spain, to emphasis its lineage in Spanish history.

Styles

The main styles (based on chronological and geographic considerations) of the Iberian Pre-Romanesque were:

Visigothic art and architecture
Asturian art, the art of the Kingdom of Asturias from 718 through the 10th century
Mozarabic art, art of mixed Arab-Spanish heritage made by the Mozarabs, the Christians under the Islamic rule.
Repoblación art and architecture (Spanish, arte de repoblación), art on the increasing Christian frontierlands. Most of the formerly called Mozarabic buildings receive nowadays also this denomination.

In Catalonia and Aragon, a style ancestral to the Romanesque developed early in parallel with the region of Lombardy and it has become common to refer the formerly called late Catalan Pre-Romanesque as "first Romanesque" after the suggestions of Josep Puig i Cadafalch.

See also
 Croatian pre-Romanesque art and architecture

Pre-Romanesque architecture in Spain
Romanesque architecture in Portugal
Spanish art
Architecture in Spain
Portuguese art
Architecture in Portugal by period or style